The 2002 South Sydney Rabbitohs season was the 93rd in the club's history and the 1st since 1999. Coached by Craig Coleman and captained by Adam Muir, Andrew Hart and Jason Death, they competed in the National Rugby League's 2002 Telstra Premiership, finishing the regular season 14th out of 15 teams, failing to reach the finals.

Ladder

Fixtures

Regular season

References 

South Sydney Rabbitohs seasons
South Sydney Rabbitohs season